Vademecum is a Latin phrase for a handbook.

Vademecum or vade mecum may also refer to:
 Vade Mecum and Vade Mecum II, albums by American jazz trumpeter Bill Dixon

See also
 Vademecum for Confessors, handbook released by the Vatican (see Religious views on birth control)
 "Vademecum skauta", song on the album Lady Pank (1982)